Gérard Dagon (4 April 1936, Strasbourg - 22 May 2011, Gandrange) was a French evangelical pastor, teacher, author, publisher and long-time Christian countercultist.

Early life and education
He got a Master of Divinity at the faculty of Protestant theology in the University of Strasbourg.

Ministry
He became pastor of the Protestant Reformed Church of Alsace and Lorraine (EPRAL) in 1959, then directed the Union of Evangelical Churches Chrischona (Union des Églises évangéliques Chrischona). He participated in the creation of the evangelical directory, then became president of the (Fédération évangélique de France)  in 1991 for a few years . He founded, alongside others such as Swiss pastor and former member of the ADFI Paul Ranc, the association Vigi-sectes in 1998 who fights against cults from an evangelical perspective. He published books about Protestant movements, about Christian-oriented groups he considered cults because of their supposed biblical errors, and an extensive encyclopedia on Christianity. He listed 150 people who have claimed to be the Messiah from the first century CE. At the end of his ministry, he became pastor of an Independent Baptist church in Moselle.

Reception 
In 1998, the pastor of the Reformed Church of Alsace and Lorraine Sylvain Dujancourt accused Dagon of using his anti-cult campaign to attract new people to his church.

Sébastien Fath considered Dagon a "key figure of French evangelical Protestantism since the 1970s", and Émile Poulat qualified him a "pioneer" in the religious issues.

Main works
 Les Sectes en France, 1958
 Petites églises de France, Amneville, six volumes, 1960s-1970s
 Parlons sectes, Barnabas editions, 1991, 
 Panorama de la France Évangélique, Barnabas editions, 1993, 
 Les Sectes à visage découvert : Tome 1 , Yerres : Barnabas editions, 1995, 
 Les Sectes à visage découvert : Tome 2 , Dozulé :Barnabas editions, 1997, 
  Nouvelle Encyclopédie chrétienne, Gandrange, 2005, 1247 p.,

References

External links
  Site of Vigi-sectes

1936 births
2011 deaths
French Calvinist and Reformed ministers
Evangelical pastors
Clergy from Strasbourg
People of the Christian countercult movement